Computers in Entertainment was an online academic journal and magazine that featured both peer-reviewed articles as well as news content covering entertainment technology, products, services, and notable people. The editor-in-chief was Newton Lee and the journal was published from 2003 to 2018 by the Association for Computing Machinery. From 2009 to 2011, Adrian David Cheok and Masa Inakage were co-editors-in-chief together with Lee.

Abstracting and indexing
The journal is abstracted and indexed in:
EBSCO databases
Ei Compendex
Emerging Sources Citation Index
Inspec
ProQuest databases,
Scopus

References

External links

Computers in Entertainment
Publications established in 2003
Publications disestablished in 2018
English-language journals
Quarterly journals